

See also
 List of association football competitions in Portugal
 Portuguese football competitions

References

4
Fifth level football leagues in Europe
Sixth level football leagues in Europe